György Szigeti (29 January 1905 – 27 November 1978),
also known as Gyorgy Szigeti, was a Hungarian physicist and engineer who developed tungsten lamps.

In 1923 at Tungsram Ltd., a research laboratory was established for improving light sources, mainly electric bulbs. The head of that laboratory was Ignácz Pfeiffer (1867-1941), whose research staff included Szigeti, along with Zoltán Bay (1900-1992), Tivadar Millner, Imre Bródy (1891-1944), Ernő Winter (1897-1971), and others.

Szigeti worked together with Zoltán Bay on metal-vapor lamps and fluorescent light sources. They received a U.S. patent on "electroluminescent light sources" that were made of silicon carbide; these light sources were the ancestors of light-emitting diodes (LEDs).

Notes

External links 
 KFKI notes on György Szigeti.
 HPO-Hungary on György Szigeti.
 BzLogi-Hungary-Bzaka on György Szigeti.

20th-century Hungarian physicists
20th-century Hungarian inventors
20th-century Hungarian engineers
1905 births
1978 deaths